The girls' skeleton event at the 2016 Winter Youth  Olympics took place on 19 February at the Lillehammer Olympic Bobsleigh and Luge Track.

Results

References

External links
Results
 

Skeleton at the 2016 Winter Youth Olympics